John Tobin (born 1952) is an Irish former Gaelic football manager and player. His league and championship career at senior level with the Galway county team spanned twelve seasons from 1971 until 1983. Tobin served as manager of the team from 1989 until 1993 before taking charge of Roscommon from 2000 to 2001.

Honours

Player
Tuam Stars
Galway Senior Football Championship (1): 1984

Galway
Connacht Senior Football Championship (5): 1973, 1974, 1976, 1982, 1983
All-Ireland Minor Football Championship (1): 1970
Connacht Minor Football Championship (1): 1970
All-Ireland Under-21 Football Championship (1): 1972
Connacht Under-21 Football Championship (1): 1972

Individual
All Star Football Award (1): 1974

Manager
Roscommon
Connacht Senior Football Championship (1): 2001

References

1952 births
Living people
All Stars Awards winners (football)
Gaelic football forwards
Gaelic football managers
Galway inter-county Gaelic footballers
Irish schoolteachers
People from Tuam
Tuam Stars Gaelic footballers